Adela Carboné (1890 – 9 August 1960) was an Italian-born actress who lived in Spain.

Biography

Adela Carboné was born in Genoa and moved to Spain when she was 10 years old. Dedicated to the theater at a young age, and after training with María Tubau, she debuted in the play Amor que pasa by the Quintero brothers at the Teatre Principal in Barcelona.

After the Spanish Civil War, Carboné continued her career until her retirement from the stage in 1959.

Carboné acted in 20 films, including Jeromín (1953) and The Little Nightingale (1958).

She translated the Pirandello play Il carnevale dei morti into Spanish as Carnaval de los muertos. Her portrait was painted by José Ramón Zaragoza  and exhibited at the Museum of Fine Arts of Asturias.

She died after a long and painful illness.

Awards
 Gold Medal of the Círculo de Bellas Artes
 National Theater Prize (1955)

References

External links

 

1890 births
1960 deaths
Italian–Spanish translators
Actresses from Madrid
Spanish film actresses
Spanish stage actresses
20th-century translators
Italian emigrants to Spain